Seacroft is a linear settlement in the East Lindsey district of Lincolnshire, England. It lies at the south of, and is conjoined to, Skegness, and comprises the less than half-mile long residential road, Seacroft Esplanade, and a golf course at its south. Farther south is Gibraltar Point nature reserve.

References

External links

Villages in Lincolnshire
Populated coastal places in Lincolnshire
East Lindsey District